Dmitri Yevgenyevich Sychev (born 26 October 1983) is a former Russian association footballer who played as a forward or as a midfielder. He was hailed by the international press as "The Russian Michael Owen", because of his pace, and was dubbed "the most sensational young Russian forward since Vladimir Beschastnykh". He was well known for his blinding pace and agility.

Early life
Sychev was born in Omsk, a city in south-central Russia. He spent his formative years at St. Petersburg's famous Smena football academy before joining FC Spartak Tambov, a second division club. At that time he played as a midfielder.

Club career

Spartak Moscow and Marseille
After having trials at clubs in FC Nantes and FC Metz, Sychev was picked up by FC Spartak Moscow in January 2002, where he scored eight goals in his first 12 matches, and it was during that time when he was transformed into a striker. With Spartak he reached the final of the 2002 Commonwealth of Independent States Cup. He scored 6 goals and finished second on the top scorer list, after coming in as a substitute in every match he played. He entered the symbolic top players list of the tournament.

In August 2002, Sychev announced he was quitting Spartak, by giving his employers three months' notice. Having already signed a five-year contract with the Russian club he was banned from football for four months by the Russian Professional Football League (RPFL).

After finishing this suspension, Sychev signed a five-year contract with Olympique de Marseille, rejecting an offer from FC Dynamo Kyiv. He was used as a midfielder, both left and right, but was usually a substitute during his time in France.

Lokomotiv Moscow

In January 2004, Sychev returned to Russia to join FC Lokomotiv Moscow on a four-year contract, where he scored twice on the opening day of the season. He went on to claim the Russian Footballer of the Year award in his first season back in the Russian Premier League. With the club, he won the 2004 Russian Premier League, the 2005 Russian Super Cup, the 2005 Commonwealth of Independent States Cup and 2007 Russian Cup. Sychev played mostly as a striker, except the period when Lokomotiv was coached by Anatoliy Byshovets and Rashid Rakhimov respectively. During those times, he was mainly employed as a midfielder. Sychev started playing again in his natural position with the appointment of Yury Syomin. In 2009, he was voted by Lokomotiv fans as the player of the season. In the 2012–13 season, under manager Slaven Bilić, Sychev lost his place in the line-up (only four games in the first half of season, including the national cup).

Loan spells
In March 2013, Sychev moved to FC Dinamo Minsk on loan until July of the same year.

In July 2013, after returning from Dinamo Minsk, Sychev moved to fellow Russian Premier League side FC Volga Nizhny Novgorod on a year-long loan deal. Sychev featured in 16 league games for Volga, failing to score in any of them, and returned to Lokomotiv Moscow at the end of the season following Volga's relegation to the Russian National Football League.

On 16 March 2015, Sychev moved to FC Okzhetpes on a season-long loan deal.

Pyunik
After over a year away from football, Sychev signed for FC Pyunik on 31 August 2019. On 6 December 2019, Sychev left Pyunik by mutual consent having failed to make a first team appearance for the club. On 10 December 2019, he announced his retirement from playing.

International career

Sychev was selected to play for the Russian national team at the 2002 FIFA World Cup, where he became the youngest player to appear for the Soviet Union or Russia at 18 years and 222 days. In the event, he scored a goal and set up other three in an otherwise disappointing Russian campaign. This goal made him the fourth youngest goalscorer in the FIFA World Cup.

Sychev was called up to Russia's squad for UEFA Euro 2008 in Austria and Switzerland. Despite playing as a striker at Lokomotiv Moscow, during Guus Hiddink's stint with the Russian national team, he was used as a midfielder. He won his last cap in 2010.

Personal life
Besides football, Sychev is a fan of ice hockey and his hometown team Avangard Omsk. He also likes tennis and billiards. Outside of sports, he plays the guitar and was seen rapping at the MTV Russia Music Awards ceremony in Moscow with national teammate Diniyar Bilyaletdinov.

Aside from his native Russian, Sychev also speaks English, French, and plans to learn more.

In 2007, Sychev received a degree from the Russian State University of Physical Education, Sport, Youth and Tourism.

Sychev was in Danila Kozlovsky's directorial debut Coach which was released in 2018. Sychev portrayed Dodin, the player who scored the winning goal for his team.

Career statistics

Club

International

Statistics accurate as of match played 11 August 2010

International goals 
Statistics accurate as of match played 23 May 2008

Honours

Club
Lokomotiv Moscow
 Russian Premier League: 2004
 Russian Cup: 2006–07
 Russian Super Cup: 2005
 Commonwealth of Independent States Cup: 2005

International
 UEFA European Football Championship Bronze medal: 2008

Individual
Lokomotiv Moscow
 Footballer of the Year in Russia (Sport-Express): 2004
 Footballer of the Year in Russia (Futbol): 2004

Notes

References

External links

 
 
 
 
 
 Player profile 

1983 births
Living people
Sportspeople from Omsk
Russian footballers
Association football forwards
Association football midfielders
Russia youth international footballers
Russia under-21 international footballers
Russia international footballers
2002 FIFA World Cup players
UEFA Euro 2004 players
UEFA Euro 2008 players
Russian expatriate footballers
Expatriate footballers in France
Expatriate footballers in Belarus
Expatriate footballers in Kazakhstan
Russian Premier League players
Ligue 1 players
FC Spartak Tambov players
FC Spartak Moscow players
Olympique de Marseille players
FC Lokomotiv Moscow players
FC Dinamo Minsk players
FC Volga Nizhny Novgorod players
FC Okzhetpes players
Russian State University of Physical Education, Sport, Youth and Tourism alumni
Russian podcasters